Brighton le Sands can refer to the following locations:

Brighton-Le-Sands, New South Wales, Australia
Brighton le Sands, Sefton, England